Upper Dumbell Lake is a lake in Qikiqtaaluk Region, Nunavut. It is the northernmost named lake of Canada and of the world.

Lakes of Qikiqtaaluk Region
Ellesmere Island